Patrick Angus (1953–1992) was a 20th-century American painter who, among many other works, created a number acrylic paintings of the interior of the Gaiety Theater and some of its dancers and customers in the 1980s. Some of the titles are:  Grand Finale (1985), The Apollo Room I (1986), Remember the Promise You Made (1986), Slave to the Rhythm (1986), All The Love in the World (1987), and Hanky Panky (1991).

Although a dedicated creator of portraits and still lifes, and an occasional designer of stage settings, Angus is principally known for works begun in 1981 depicting the young male erotic dancers at the Gaiety and other New York showplaces. Referring to an earlier French painter who made his reputation depicting the demi-monde, playwright Robert Patrick deemed Angus "The Toulouse-Lautrec of Times Square."

Angus died on May 13, 1992, from complications related to AIDS.

In popular culture
Angus appears as himself in the 1990 documentary movie Resident Alien about Quentin Crisp in New York. Angus is portrayed by actor Jonathan Tucker in the 2009 dramatic movie An Englishman in New York, a biographical picture about Crisp's later years. Crisp befriends Angus in both films, and encourages him to show his work.

Further reading
 Thomas Fuchs, Mark Gisbourne, Douglas Blair Turnbaugh: Patrick Angus, Berlin : Hatje Cantz, 2016, 
 Ulrike Groos: Patrick Angus : Private Show, Berlin : DISTANZ Verlag [2017],

References

Patrick Angus Los Angeles Drawings, Introduction by Douglas Blair Turnbaugh, Published by Leslie - Lohman Gay Art Foundation, New York City and Schwules Museum Berlin, 2003.  

20th-century American painters
American male painters
American LGBT painters
1953 births
1992 deaths
Gay painters
American gay artists
AIDS-related deaths in New York (state)
People from North Hollywood, Los Angeles
20th-century American LGBT people
20th-century American male artists